The 1992 Trans America Athletic Conference men's basketball tournament (now known as the ASUN men's basketball tournament) was held March 6–8 at the Hanner Fieldhouse in Statesboro, Georgia.

Hosts Georgia Southern defeated  in the championship game, 95–82, to win their third TAAC/Atlantic Sun men's basketball tournament. The Eagles, therefore, received the TAAC's automatic bid to the 1992 NCAA tournament.

Two teams, Arkansas–Little Rock and Texas–San Antonio, departed the TAAC prior to the season (UALR joined the Sun Belt and UTSA joined the Southland). In turn, the two were replaced by Southeastern Louisiana and Florida International, thus maintaining conference membership at eight teams.

The TAAC tournament was not held again until 1994.

Bracket

References

ASUN men's basketball tournament
Tournament
TAAC men's basketball tournament
TAAC men's basketball tournament